Mahou or  is the Japanese word for "magic", "sorcery" or "witchcraft". 

Mahou may also refer to:

Mahou (beer), brewed by the Spanish brewing company Grupo Mahou-San Miguel
Mahou-San Miguel Group, a Spanish brewing company
Mahou, Mali
Magical Company (also known as Mahou or Mahō), Japanese video game company